A former UK Parliament constituency in Ireland, returning two MPs to the United Kingdom House of Commons.

Boundaries
This constituency comprised the whole of County Kildare.

Members of Parliament

Elections

Elections in the 1830s

 
 
 

 
 

 
 
 

 
 
 

O'Ferrall was appointed as a Commissioner of the Treasury, requiring a by-election.

Elections in the 1840s

Elections in the 1850s
Bourke was appointed Chief Secretary for Ireland, requiring a by-election.

Elections in the 1860s

 
 

FitzGerald was appointed Treasurer of the Household, requiring a by-election.

 

 
 

Fitzgerald was appointed Comptroller of the Household, requiring a by-election.

Elections in the 1870s

Elections in the 1880s

References

The Parliaments of England by Henry Stooks Smith (1st edition published in three volumes 1844–50), 2nd edition edited (in one volume) by F.W.S. Craig (Political Reference Publications 1973)

Westminster constituencies in County Kildare (historic)
Constituencies of the Parliament of the United Kingdom established in 1801
Constituencies of the Parliament of the United Kingdom disestablished in 1885